Uetliberg is a railway station in Switzerland, situated near to the summit of the Uetliberg mountain. The station is the terminus of the Uetliberg line, which is operated by the Sihltal Zürich Uetliberg Bahn (SZU). It is located within the municipality of Stallikon, although the adjacent mountain-top is divided between Stallikon and the city of Zürich.

The station dates back to 1875, when the Uetlibergbahn-Gesellschaft opened its line from Bahnhof Selnau in Zürich to the summit of the Uetliberg mountain. The line was electrified using the direct current system in 1923.

The station is served by the following passenger trains:

It has two terminal tracks, and a substantial station building, including a restaurant.

Gallery

References

External links 

Railway stations in the canton of Zürich